Dorina Korsós (born 3 September 1995 in Kecskemét) is a Hungarian handballer who plays for CS Rapid București.

Achievements
EHF Champions League:
Winner: 2013, 2014, 2017
Nemzeti Bajnokság I:
Winner: 2012, 2013, 2014, 2016, 2017
Magyar Kupa:
Winner: 2012, 2013, 2014, 2015, 2016
Liga Națională:
Winner: 2022

Individual awards
 Best Defender of the EHF Champions League: 2015

References

External links 
 Dorina Korsós player profile @ Győri ETO KC Official Website
 Dorina Korsós Career Statistics

1995 births
Living people
People from Kecskemét
Hungarian female handball players
Győri Audi ETO KC players
Expatriate handball players
Hungarian expatriate sportspeople in Germany
Sportspeople from Bács-Kiskun County